Change My Mind may refer to:

 "Change My Mind" (The Oak Ridge Boys song), originally recorded by The Oak Ridge Boys in 1991 and by John Berry in 1996
 Change My Mind (album), a 2012 album by Billy Ray Cyrus, or the title song
 Change My Mind (meme), an internet meme introduced in 2018
 "Change My Mind" (One Direction song)
 "Change My Mind", a song by Puddle of Mudd from the album Life on Display
 Change My Mind, a segment of Louder with Crowder
 "Changed My Mind", a song by Todrick Hall from Forbidden
 "Changed My Mind", a song by Tove Styrke from Sway